Prince Kanwaljit Singh (born 2 March 1980), commonly known as Prince K.J Singh, is an Indian film actor, dialogue writer, and director. He is known for his works in Punjabi cinema. Prince became well-known after receiving plaudits for his performance in the web series Warning.

Early life and education 
Kanwaljit was born on 2 March 1980 in Kotkapura, Faridkot, Punjab, India where he did his schooling from Punjab India.

Career 
Prince began his career as an actor and now primarily works in the Punjabi cinema, in 2010 he made his acting debut in Sukhmani. Kanawaljit also played a leading role in blockbuster films Zila Sangrur, Shareek, Warning 2, Panchhi and Warning and in Criminal.

In movies like Yaraan Naal Baharaan 2 (2012), Shareek (2015), Teshan (2016), and Toofan Singh (2017)), he primarily portrayed minor and supporting roles. Jatt Boys Jattan De (2013) was Singh's first feature film as a writer, Leather Life (2015), Teshan (2016), Shadaa (2019), Mitti (2019), Gidarh Singhi (2019), and Ik Sandhu Hunda Siare some of his other famous films as a writer (2020). Kanwaljit became well-known after receiving plaudits for his performance in the web series Warning.

Filmography

Writer

References

External links 

 

1980 births
Living people
Indian male comedians
Punjabi people
21st-century Indian male actors
Male actors from Punjab, India
Indian male voice actors